Hwaseo Station is a ground-level metro station on line 1 of the Seoul Subway in north-west Suwon, South Korea. 

Hwaseo offers access to several important academic, governmental and cultural locations including Hwaseong Fortress, Manseok Park, the Korean National Institute of Agricultural Science and Technology and Suwon Immigration Office, as well as being the nearest station to Seoho, a sizeable lake and park.

Travel time from Hwaseo to central Seoul on Line 1 is approximately 80 minutes, with slightly shorter journey times possible by transferring to Line 4 at Geumjeong. To save time when exiting, you should try to be in the front subway cars when traveling north, towards Seoul, and in the back subway cars when traveling south, towards Suwon and Cheonan.

It is planned to become a transfer station to the Shinbundang Line in 2027.

References

Seoul Metropolitan Subway stations
Metro stations in Suwon
Railway stations opened in 1974